Choqur Chah (also Romanized as Choqūr Chāh; also known as Choqerchāh and Choqerchah) is a village in Satar Rural District, Kolyai District, Sonqor County, Kermanshah Province, Iran. At the 2006 census, its population was 90, in 24 families.

References 

Populated places in Sonqor County